Song Shanshan (born 25 March 1987) is a former professional tennis player. She won six ITF titles, all in doubles, including two $25k tournaments.

Song made her WTA Tour main-draw debut in the doubles at the 2006 Guangzhou International Open, where she and Chen Yanchong made the quarterfinals, with a win over future world number one doubles player Elena Vesnina and her partner Anna Chakvetadze.

At the 2007 Guangzhou International Open, she qualified for the singles main draw and defeated Chinese wildcard Ji Chunmei in the first round, before being eliminated in the second round by fourth seed Dominika Cibulková.

ITF Circuit finals

Singles: 1 (0–1)

Doubles: 8 (6–2)

References

External links
 
 

1987 births
Living people
Chinese female tennis players
21st-century Chinese women